Kelly Regterschot (born 22 February 1975) is a Dutch politician, currently serving as a Member of Parliament for the People's Party for Freedom and Democracy (Volkspartij voor Vrijheid en Democratie) since June 2019.

References

1975 births
Living people
People's Party for Freedom and Democracy politicians